An altered state of consciousness (ASC), also called altered state of mind or mind alteration, is any condition which is significantly different from a normal waking state. By 1892, the expression was in use in relation to hypnosis, though there is an ongoing debate as to whether hypnosis is to be identified as an ASC according to its modern definition. The next retrievable instance, by Dr Max Mailhouse from his 1904 presentation to conference, however, is unequivocally identified as such, as it was in relation to epilepsy, and is still used today. In academia, the expression was used as early as 1966 by Arnold M. Ludwig and brought into common usage from 1969 by Charles Tart. It describes induced changes in one's mental state, almost always temporary. A synonymous phrase is "altered state of awareness".

Definitions 
There is no general definition of an altered state of consciousness, as any definitional attempt would first have to rely on a definition of a normal state of consciousness. Attempts to define the term can however be found in philosophy, psychology and neuroscience. There is no final consensus on what the most accurate definition is. In the following, the best established and latest definitions are provided:

Arnold M. Ludwig attempted a first definition in 1966.

"An altered state is any mental state(s), induced by various physiological, psychological, or pharmacological maneuvers or agents, which can be recognized subjectively by the individual himself (or by an objective observer of the individual) as representing a sufficient deviation in subjective experience of psychological functioning from certain general norms for that individual during alert, waking consciousness."

Starting from this, Charles Tart focuses his definition on the subjective experience of a state of consciousness and its deviation from a normal waking state.

"Altered states of consciousness are alternate patterns or configurations of experience, which differ qualitatively from a baseline state."

Farthing's definition of an altered state of consciousness (ASC) is based on Charles Tart's terminology. Charles Tart described an altered state of consciousness as a profound change in the "overall pattern of subjective experiences". In order to define an ASC, Tart focuses on the importance of subjective experience.

Farthing adds to his definition that an ASC is short-termed or at least reversible and that it might not even be recognized as an ASC at that moment. His definition relies only on subjective experience, leaving aside behavioral changes and physiological response.

"An altered state of consciousness (ASC) may be defined as a temporary change in the overall pattern of subjective experience, such that the individual believes that his or her mental functioning is distinctly different from certain general norms for his or her normal waking state of consciousness". Farthing (1992, p. 205)

He lists fourteen dimensions of changed subjective experience. To account for an ASC, multiple dimensions need to be altered.

A recent working definition for empirical research is based on these previous definitions and provided by Schmidt.

[Translated from German]: 
As a working definition for neuroscientific research, it might suffice to presume that most people have a strong intuition concerning which variability in their everyday wakeful state feels normal to them. This variability of experience is considered as normal fluctuation, while any state that is experienced to diverge significantly from it can be called an ASC. From an experimental perspective, it is also reasonable to compare ASC conditions to a baseline state – a state subjectively judged as average, or normal. The comparison with a 'normal' baseline requires that the ASC under investigation is of relatively short duration (minutes to hours), which differentiates ASCs from most pathological conditions. Importantly, it has been emphasized that an ASC is not a mere quantitative change in a single cognitive function (e.g. elevated arousal). Instead, it is a multidimensional phenomenon. Thereby, the relative intensity of multiple consciousness aspects constitutes a 'phenomenological pattern' characterizing a particular state. Such 'patterns' have also been referred to as relative changes in the '(basic) dimensions of consciousness'. For empirical research, such patterns correspond to a multivariate combination of independent 'consciousness factors', which can be quantified via questionnaires. The 'phenomenological pattern' results from the factor structure of the applied psychometric assessment, i.e. the individual ratings, or factor scores, of a questionnaire.

History

History of utilization of ASCs 
Altered states of consciousness might have been employed by humans as early as 30,000 years ago. Mind-altering plants and/or excessive dancing were used to attain an ecstatic or mystic state.  Examples of early religious use of altered states of consciousness are the rites of Dionysos and the Eleusinian Mysteries, as well as yoga and meditation. Followers of various shamanic traditions "enter altered states of consciousness in order to serve their community." Terence McKenna has suggested that the use of psychedelic mushrooms in prehistoric times has led to the "evolution of human language and symbol use". Some theorists propose that mind-altering substances, such as Soma, might have pushed the formation of some of the world's main religions.

Meditation in its various forms is being rediscovered by modern psychology because of its therapeutic potential and its ability to "enable the activity of the mind to settle down". In Psychotherapy techniques like hypnosis, meditation, support psychological processes.

History of the science and theoretical-modelling 

Due to the behaviourist paradigm in psychology altered states of consciousness were dismissed as a field of scientific inquiry during the early 20th century. They were pathologized and merely seen as symptoms of intoxication or demonic possession.

Their return into psychology began with Wiliam James' interest into a variety of altered states, such as "mystical experiences and drug-induced states". James' investigations into first-person-subjective-experience contributed to the reconsideration of introspection as a valuable research method in the academic community.

The social change of the turbulent 1960s has decisively led to a change of the scientific perspective to the point that introspection as a scientific method and ASCs as valid realms of experience became more widely accepted. Foundations for the research have been laid out by various scientists such as Abraham Maslow, Walter N. Pahnke, Stanislav Grof and Charles Tart. They focused on seemingly beneficial aspects of ASCs such as their potential to "promote creativity or treat addiction". Rather oppressive states such as dissociation from trauma were neglected.

The findings of the famous Good Friday Experiment by Pahnke suggest that mystical experiences can be triggered by psilocybin. Later investigations by Rick Doblin found that participants valued those experiences as "spiritual high points of their lives".

In the midst of the rise of new-age subculture Stanislav Grof and others formed the new field of transpersonal psychology, which emphasized "the importance of individual human experience, validity of mystical and spiritual experience, interconnectedness of self with others and the world and potential of self-transformation".

Abraham Maslow's research on peak experiences, as moments of "highest happiness and fulfillment", further contributed to the depathologization of altered states.

A first summary of the existing literature was carried out by Charles T. Tart in his book Altered the States of Consciousness, which led to a more common use of the term. Tart coined the key terms discrete and baseline states of consciousness and thought about a general classification system for ASCs. He also called for "state specific sciences" in which researchers should do science on ASCs from within such states.

Classification 

A classification of Altered States of Consciousness is helpful if one wants to compare or differentiate between induced ASCs and other variations of consciousness. Various researchers have attempted the classification into a broader framework. The attempts of classification discussed in the following focus on slightly different aspects of ASCs. Several authors suggested classification schemata with regard to the genesis of altered states and with regard to the type of experiences:

A classification with five categories was suggested by Vaitl  to distinguish ASCs according to how they were induced:

 Pathological (Epilepsy, brain damage)
 Pharmacological (psychoactive substances)
 Physical and physiological (fasting and sex)
 Psychological (music, meditation, hypnosis)
 Spontaneous (day-dreaming and near death experience)

Vaitl further suggests four basic aspects of experiences: (1) activation (2) awareness span (3) self-awareness (4) sensory dynamics. Alternatively Roland Fischer suggests a classification along ergotropic (i.e., ecstasy) or trophotropic (i.e., meditation) properties. The work of Adolph Dittrich aimed to empirically determine common underlying dimensions of consciousness alterations induced by different methods, such as drugs or non-pharmacological methods. He suggested three basic dimensions, which were termed: (1) oceanic boundlessness (2) dread of ego dissolution (3) visionary restructuralization. Further, Ken Wilber proposes a multidimensional system and adds that the individual experience of an ASC is shaped by a person's unique psychological development.

Michael Winkelman identifies four different "modes of consciousness": (1) the waking mode (2) the deep sleep mode (3) the REM sleep / dreaming mode (4) the integrative mode. Within this framework, many ASCs (psychedelics, hypnosis, meditation, etc.) are defined as belonging to the integrative mode.

Induction methods

Pharmacological 
An altered state of consciousness may be defined as a short-term change in the general configuration of one's individual experience, such that the rational functioning is clearly altered from one's usual state of consciousness. There are many ways that one's consciousness can be altered, such as by using psychoactive drugs, which are defined as chemical substances that pass through the blood brain barrier and disturb brain function, causing changes in awareness, attitude, consciousness, and behavior.

Cannabis is a psychoactive drug that is known to alter the state of consciousness.  Cannabis alters mental activity, memory, and pain perception.  One who is under the influence of cannabis may (or may not) experience degrees of paranoia, increased sensitivity, and delayed reactions not normal for their usual conscious state. A 2009 review of anxiety and cannabis studies concluded that "frequent cannabis users appear to have higher levels of anxiety than non-users," and that "a considerable number of subjects developed anxiety disorders before the first symptoms of cannabis dependence." That led researchers to believe that anxiety-prone people tend to use cannabis as a self-prescribed anxiety medicine, opposing the idea that cannabis is what's causing the anxiety.

MDMA (ecstasy) is a drug that also alters one's state of consciousness.  The state of consciousness brought about by MDMA ingestion includes a rise in positive feelings and a reduction in negative feelings (Aldridge, D., & Fachner, J. ö. 2005).  Users' emotions are increased and inhibitions lowered, often accompanied by a sensation of intimacy or connection with other people.

Opioids are a class of drugs that alter consciousness.  Examples of opioids include heroin, morphine, hydrocodone, and oxycodone.  Opioids produce analgesia and often feelings of euphoria in users.  Opioid abuse may result in decreased production of endorphins in the brain, natural pain relievers whose effects may be heightened by drugs. If one takes a large dose of opioids to compensate for the lack of natural endorphins, the result may be death.

Cocaine alters one's state of consciousness.  Cocaine affects the neurotransmitters that nerves use to communicate with each other. Cocaine inhibits the reuptake of norepinephrine, serotonin, dopamine, and other neurotransmitters in the synapse, resulting in an altered state of consciousness or a "high" (Aldridge, D., & Fachner, J. ö. 2005).

Lysergic acid diethylamide, or LSD, activates serotonin receptors (the amine transmitter of nerve urges) in brain matter.  LSD acts on certain serotonin receptors, and its effects are most prominent in the cerebral cortex, an area involved in attitude, thought, and insight, which obtains sensory signs from all parts of the body.  LSD's main effects are emotional and psychological. The ingester's feelings may alter quickly through a range from fear to ecstasy. (Humphrey, N. 2001) This may cause one to experience many levels of altered consciousness.

Alcohol alters consciousness by shifting levels of neurotransmitters. Neurotransmitters are endogenous chemicals that transmit signals across a synapse from one neuron (nerve cell) to another "target" cell (often another neuron). Neurotransmitters can cause inhibitory or excitatory effects on the "target" cell they are affecting. Alcohol increases the effect of the neurotransmitter GABA (gamma-Aminobutyric acid) in the brain. GABA causes slow actions and inaudible verbal communication that often occur in alcoholics.  Alcohol also decreases the excitatory neurotransmitter glutamate. Suppressing this stimulant results in a similar type of physiological slowdown. In addition to increasing the GABA and decreasing the glutamate in the brain, alcohol increases the amount of the chemical dopamine in the brain, which is one of the addictive causes of alcoholism.

Non-pharmacological 
Altered states of consciousness may also be induced by:

 Hypnosis
 Meditation
 Spiritual experience

Emotions influence behavior that alters the state of consciousness. Emotions can be influenced by various stimuli.

Pathologies/other 
Pathological or accidental induction may refer to unforeseen events or illnesses. According to Dr. Jeffrey R. Avner, professor of clinical pediatrics, a crucial element to understanding accidental and pathological causes to altered states of consciousness (ASC) is that it begins with reduced self-awareness followed by reduced awareness in the environment (2006). Those with personal experience of conditions such as Depersonalisation often cite the opposite, that it is an increased awareness of the environment and the self that results in altered states of consciousness. When the reduction of self-awareness and environmental awareness take effect, they produce altered states of consciousness. The specific conditions below provide clarity on the types of conditions compromise accidental and pathological causes.

Traumatic experience
The first condition, traumatic experience, is defined as a lesion caused by an external force (Trauma. (n.d.) In Merriam-Webster Dictionary online, 2013). Examples include impact to the brain caused by blunt force (i.e., a car accident). The reason a traumatic experience causes altered states of consciousness is that it changes how the brain works. The external impact diverts the blood flow from the front of the brain to other areas. The front of the brain is known as the prefrontal cortex responsible for analytical thought (Kunsman, 2012). When the damage becomes uncontrollable, the patient experiences changes in behavior and impaired self-awareness. This is exactly when an altered state of consciousness is experienced.

Epilepsy
Another common cause is epilepsy. According to Medlineplus epilepsy can be described as a brain disorder that causes seizures (2013). During the seizure it is said that the patient will experience hallucinations and loss of mental control causing temporary dissociation from reality. 
A study that was conducted with six epileptic patients and used the functional magnetic resonance imaging (fMRI) detected how the patients did indeed experience hallucinations while a seizure is occurring. This not only altered the patient's behavioral pattern but also made them dissociate from reality during that particular time frame.

Oxygen deficiency
The next item of interest is oxygen deficiency, questioning how oxygen deficiency impacts the brain is an important part of comprehending why ASC occurs when there is oxygen deprivation in an environment.

Infections
In addition to oxygen deprivation or deficiency, infections are a common pathological cause of ASC. A prime example of an infection includes meningitis. The medical website WEBMD states that meningitis is an infection that causes the coverings of the brain to swell. This particular infection occurs in children and young adults. This infection is primarily viral.  Viral meningitis causes ASC and its symptoms include fevers and seizures (2010).  The Impairment becomes visible the moment seizures begin to occur, this is when the patient enters the altered state of consciousness.

Sleep deprivation
Sleep deprivation is also associated with ASC, and can provoke seizures due to fatigue. Sleep deprivation can be chronic or short-term depending on the severity of the patient's condition. Many patients report hallucinations because sleep deprivation impacts the brain.  An MRI study conducted at Harvard Medical school in 2007, found that a sleep-deprived brain was not capable of being in control of its sensorimotor functions, leading to an impairment to the patient's self-awareness. Patients were also prone to be a lot clumsier than if they had not been experiencing sleep deprivation.

Fasting
Coupled with deprivation of sleep and oxygen, another form of deprivation includes fasting. Fasting can occur because of religious purposes or from psychological conditions such as anorexia. Fasting refers to the ability to willingly refrain from food and possibly drinks as well. The dissociation caused by fasting is not only life-threatening but it is the reason why extended fasting periods can lead to ASC. Thus, the temporary dissociation from reality allows fasting to fall into the category of an ASC following the definition provided by Dr. Avner (2006).

Psychosis
Another pathological cause is psychosis, otherwise known as a psychotic episode. In order to comprehend psychosis, it is important to determine what symptoms it implies. Psychotic episodes often include delusions, paranoia, derealization, depersonalization, and hallucinations (Revonsuo et al., 2008).  Studies have not been able to clearly identify when a person is reaching a higher level of risk for a psychotic episode (Schimmelmann, B., Walger, P., & Schultze-Lutter, F., 2013), but the earlier people are treated for psychosis the more likely they are to avoid the devastating consequences which could lead to a psychotic disorder (Schimmelmann, B., Walger, P., & Schultze-Lutter, F., 2013). Unfortunately, there are very few studies which have thoroughly investigated psychotic episodes, and the ability to predict this disorder remains unclear. (Schimmelmann, B., Walger, P., & Schultze-Lutter, F., 2013).

Reviewing the previous conditions for accidental and pathological causes, we can come to understand that all of these accidental or pathological causes share the component of reduced self-awareness. Therefore, ASCs cannot only be caused naturally but they can be induced intentionally with methods including hypnosis meditation, amongst others. There are also ASCs which are caused by less recreational purposes; people who utilize illegal substances, or heavy dosages of medications, as well as large amounts of alcohol,  can indeed comply with the definition of an ASC (Revonsuo et al., 2008).

Neurobiological models of altered state experiences

Entropic brain hypothesis 

The entropic brain hypothesis by Robin L. Carhart-Harris (2014) refers to a theory which is informed by neuroimaging research that uses the hallucinogen induced neurological state to make inferences about other states of consciousness.
The expression "entropy" is applied here in the context of states of consciousness and their associated neurodynamics, while high entropy is synonymous with high disorder.
It is proposed that a general distinction can be made between two fundamentally different modes of cognition: Primary and secondary consciousness.

Primary consciousness is associated with unconstrained cognition and less ordered (higher-entropy) neurodynamics that preceded the development of modern, normal waking consciousness in adults. Examples include the psychedelic state, the rapid eye movement sleep (REM) state or the onset phase of psychosis.
Secondary consciousness is associated with constrained cognition and more ordered neurodynamics. Examples include normal waking consciousness, the anesthetized or the depressed state.

The theory further proposes that via pharmacological induction of psychedelic substances psilocybin, the brain is able to enter into the primary state of consciousness (the psychedelic state) from normal waking consciousness. This "phase transition" between these two fundamentally different poles of consciousness is facilitated by a collapse of the normally highly organized activity within the default mode network (DMN) and a decoupling between the DMN and the medial temporal lobes (MTLs), which are normally significantly coupled.
The DMN is closely associated with higher-order cognitive functions such as supporting the neurological basis for the self (e.g. self-reflection, subjectivity, introspection), thinking about others (e.g. theory of mind), remembering the past and thinking about the future (e.g. episodic memory). Task-positive networks are associated with the inverse of these things e.g., focus on and scrutiny of the external world.

The entropic brain hypothesis emphasizes the great research potential of the psychedelic state of mind for gaining more insight into general human consciousness.

CSTC-loop 

Extensive scientific investigation on altered states of consciousness and their relationship to drug interactions with receptors in the brain have been performed. Particularly the study of the neurotransmitter serotonin and the effects of psychedelic drugs on the brain has been intensively researched over the past sixty years. It has been hypothesized that hallucinogens act either as an antagonist or an agonist at serotonin-2A receptors and will elicit a state that shares some common phenomenological features with early acute stages of the group of schizophrenia disorders.

Findings implicate that abnormalities of serotonin function and the serotonergic system could be responsible for psychiatric disorders such as the spectrum of schizophrenia (gating) disorders and therefore, that serotonin agonist or antagonists might be useful in the treatment of e.g. schizophrenia. To investigate the underlying causative neurotransmitter mechanisms of this phenomenon, the CSTC (cortico-striato-thalamo-cortical) loop model has been formulated based on empirical neurobiological work. 
It is indicated that the common hypofrontality (underactivation of frontal brain parts) and cortical activation pattern induced by serotonergic and glutamatergic hallucinogens is due to a common disruption of thalamic gating of sensory and cognitive information. The CSTC feedback loop plays a major role in gating or filtering out external and internal information to the cortex. Thereby it influences the regulation of the level of awareness and attention.

Disruption of the CSTC loop system is proposed to significantly influence information processing, e.g. the ability to screen out, inhibit filter or gate extraneous stimuli and to direct selective attention to salient features of the environment.
Failures of these attentional gating mechanisms might overload patients with the excessive processing of both sensory and cognitive stimuli, which could lead to a breakdown of cognitive integrity and difficulty in distinguishing self from non-self and failure to integrate an overwhelming flood of information. Descriptive elaboration of the mentioned effects can be found in the literature on schizophrenia as well as in descriptions of hallucinogenic drug action.

Despite strong evidence linking serotonin and psychosis, novel research indicates that some behavioral effects of drugs such as psilocybin appear to be independent of the classical 5-HT2A receptor-agonist actions, implying that the model described here is not the only underlying framework at play. Interdisciplinary research enterprises have set out to study the convergence of serotonergic and glutamatergic models of psychosis and dynamic neurotransmitter interactions, derived from the study of hallucinogenic drugs, in the future.

See also

Notes

References

Sources

 "Harvard Heart Letter examines the costs of not getting enough sleep – Harvard Health Publications". Health.harvard.edu. 31 May 2012. Retrieved 2012-08-13.
 Aldridge, D., & Fachner, J. ö. (2005). Chapter 7: Music and drug-induced altered states of consciousness. (pp. 82–96)
 
 
 
 
 
 
 
 

 
 Louis Breger. (1967) Function of Dreams. Journal of Abnormal Psychology Monograph, Vol 72, No. 5, Part 2 of 2 Parts, 1–28
 Meningitis - Topic Overview (December 8, 2010) from: Meningitis (Bacterial, Viral, and Fungal)

Further reading

 Beyerstein, Barry. "Altered States of Consciousness," in  The Encyclopedia of the Paranormal, edited by Gordon Stein (Buffalo, N.Y.: Prometheus Books, 1996).
 Beyerstein, Barry. "The Myth of Alpha Consciousness," Skeptical Inquirer, 10, no. 1 [1985].
 Blackmore, Susan J., Dying to Live : Near-death Experiences, (Buffalo, N.Y.: Prometheus Books, 1993).
Bourguignon, Erika (1973). Religion, Altered States of Consciousness, and Social Change. Ohio State Univ. Press, Columbus.  Full text

Hoffman, Kay (1998). The Trance Workbook: Understanding and Using the Power of Altered States. Translated by Elfie Homann, Clive Williams, and Dr. Christliebe El Mogharbel. Translation edited by Laurel Ornitz. 
James, William (1902). The Varieties of Religious Experience 

 Persinger, Michael. Neuropsychological Bases of God Beliefs (Praeger Pub Text., 1987).
Roberts, T.B. "Chemical Input—Religious Output: Entheogens." Chapter 10 of Where God and Science Meet: Vol. 3: The Psychology of Religious Experience. Edited by Robert McNamara. Westport, CT: Praeger/Greenwood, 2006.  
Roberts, T.B. (Ed.) (2001). Psychoactive Sacramentals: Essays on Entheogens and Religion. San Francisco: Council on Spiritual Practices. 
Roberts, T.B. and P.J. Hruby. (1995–2002). Religion and Psychoactive Sacraments: An Entheogen Chrestomathy .  Online archive 
 Sacks, Oliver W. A leg to stand on (New York : Summit Books, 1984).
 Sacks, Oliver W. An anthropologist on Mars : seven paradoxical tales (New York : Knopf, 1995).
 Sacks, Oliver W. Awakenings, [1st. ed. in the U.S.] (Garden City, N.Y.,  Doubleday, 1974).
 Sacks, Oliver W. The man who mistook his wife for a hat and other clinical tales (New York : Summit Books, 1985).
Shear, Jonathan. (2011). "Eastern Approaches to Altered States of Consciousness". Altering consciousness. volume 1: multidisciplinary perspectives.
 Spanos, Nicholas P. Multiple Identities and False Memories: A Sociocognitive Perspective (Washington, D.C.: American Psychological Association, 1996).
Weinel, Jonathan (2012).  "Altered States of Consciousness as an Adaptive Principle for Composing Electroacoustic Music".  Unpublished PhD Thesis.
Weinel, Jonathan (August 2010). "Bass Drum, Saxophone & Laptop: Real-time psychedelic performance software." eContact! 12.4 – Perspectives on the Electroacoustic Work / Perspectives sur l'œuvre électroacoustique. Montréal: Canadian Electroacoustic Community.
Wier, Dennis R. (1995) Trance: From Magic to Technology. Transmedia. 

Consciousness studies
Hallucinations
Hypnosis
Metaphysics of mind
Mysticism
Neuroscience
Mental states
Reality